Myrt and Marge may refer to:
Myrt and Marge (radio series), a radio serial
Myrt and Marge (film), a 1933 film based on the radio show starring The Three Stooges